Ammapalayam is a small village situated in Dharmapuri district, Tamil Nadu state in southern India. The village has one middle school.

Commerce
Agriculture is the leading source of income for the village. Farmers grow paddy, sugarcane, turmeric, cotton and other grains. Sugarcane is processed locally at the Subramaniya Shiva co-op sugar mill.

Temples and festivals
The village people mostly worship Hindu gods have few temples
 Ayyapan Temple
 Mari Amman Temple
 Murugan Temple
 Pachai Amman Temple

The village celebrate a local festival called Pachai Amman Thiruvila every year at the end of July, Tamil month Aadi 18th.

References

External links
tnmaps.tn.nic.in

Villages in Dharmapuri district